Debates between the Socialist Party of Great Britain and other groups were a core component of promoting the SPGB's doctrines and exposing its message to a broader audience.

Debates were not a major part of the SPGB until the 1930s. Before then, the party instead relied on outdoor speaking, particularly at established street corner venues. The number of SPGB debates held peaked in the 1980s. In the last ten years, however, debating has virtually ceased as an operation of the SPGB.

The SPGB has been noted for its willingness to debate against far right figures such as S. R. Probyn, Michael Goulding and Raven Thompson from the British Union of Fascists, and Denis Pirie from the National Front.

Until the 1970s, debates were primarily held in the winter months. Most of the debates have occurred in London, where the party headquarters is based.

List of debates 
This is not a full list since many debates, particularly in the early years, went unreported in the Socialist Standard, the main source of information.

Notes 

Debates
Political debates